In architecture, "gallery" may refer to:
 A balcony or low roof promenade inside a building, or facing a courtyard.
 Gallery (theatre), a zone above other seating, aisles or side rooms inside a theater or church
 Minstrels' gallery, a balcony used by performing musicians

 A covered passage connecting fortifications
Counterscarp gallery, a passage behind the back wall of the defensive ditch of a fort
Gibraltar's Great Siege Tunnels, also known as the Upper Galleries
 Long gallery, a space in a large house used as both a sitting room and corridor

Architectural elements